In France and in other countries like Portugal, Spain, Belgium or Switzerland, a Biological pharmacist (called Pharmacien biologiste in France) is a Pharmacist specialized in Clinical Biology a speciality similar to Clinical Pathology.
They have almost the same rights as  Medical Doctors specialized in this discipline. They both are called a "Clinical biologist"".

These Pharm.D. follow a "post-graduate" formation in hospital's medical laboratories.

In France, this specialization called "Internat de Biologie médicale" is a residency and lasts fours years after the five undergraduate years common to all pharmacists.

External links
 Reglementation for French Residency in Clinical Pathology (Biologie médicale)
 Curriculum Content of French Resident formation in Clinical Pathology, First Level and Second Level

See also
 Pathology
 Medical laboratory
 Anatomic pathology
 Medical technologist
 Veterinary pathology
 Clinical Biologist

Pathology